The 1980 Michigan Wolverines baseball team represented the University of Michigan in the 1980 NCAA Division I baseball season. The head coach was Bud Middaugh, serving his 1st year. The Wolverines finished the season in 5th place in the 1980 College World Series.

Roster

Schedule 

! style="" | Regular Season
|- valign="top" 

|- align="center" bgcolor="#ffcccc"
| 1 || February 28 || at  || UT Baseball Field • Tampa, Florida || 7–11 || 0–1 || 0–0
|- align="center" bgcolor="#ffcccc"
| 2 || February 29 || at  || Unknown • St. Petersburg, Florida || 6–8 || 0–2 || 0–0
|-

|- align="center" bgcolor="#ccffcc"
| 3 || March 3 || vs  || Unknown • Lakeland, Florida || 8–3 || 1–2 || 0–0
|- align="center" bgcolor="#ccffcc"
| 4 || March 3 || vs  || Unknown • Lakeland, Florida || 8–3 || 2–2 || 0–0
|- align="center" bgcolor="#ffcccc"
| 5 || March 4 || vs  || Unknown • Lakeland, Florida || 0–1 || 2–3 || 0–0
|- align="center" bgcolor="#ccffcc"
| 6 || March 4 || vs Old Dominion || Unknown • Lakeland, Florida || 7–4 || 3–3 || 0–0
|- align="center" bgcolor="#ffcccc"
| 7 || March 6 || vs Old Dominion || Unknown • Lakeland, Florida || 0–8 || 3–4 || 0–0
|- align="center" bgcolor="#ccffcc"
| 8 || March 6 || vs Old Dominion || Unknown • Lakeland, Florida || 4–2 || 4–4 || 0–0
|- align="center" bgcolor="#ffcccc"
| 9 || March 7 || at Tampa || UT Baseball Field • Tampa, Florida || 4–14 || 4–5 || 0–0
|- align="center" bgcolor="#ffcccc"
| 10 || March 9 || vs Missouri || Unknown • Lakeland, Florida || 2–3 || 4–6 || 0–0
|- align="center" bgcolor="#ccffcc"
| 11 || March 10 || vs  || Unknown • Lakeland, Florida || 5–3 || 5–6 || 0–0
|- align="center" bgcolor="#ffcccc"
| 12 || March 10 || vs Eckerd || Unknown • Lakeland, Florida || 1–4 || 5–7 || 0–0
|- align="center" bgcolor="#ccffcc"
| 13 || March 11 || vs  || Unknown • Lakeland, Florida || 7–4 || 6–7 || 0–0
|- align="center" bgcolor="#ccffcc"
| 14 || March 29 ||  || Ray Fisher Stadium • Ann Arbor, Michigan || 3–0 || 7–7 || 0–0
|- align="center" bgcolor="#ffcccc"
| 15 || March 29 || Grand Valley State || Ray Fisher Stadium • Ann Arbor, Michigan || 0–3 || 7–8 || 0–0
|-

|- align="center" bgcolor="#ccffcc"
| 16 || April 2 ||  || Ray Fisher Stadium • Ann Arbor, Michigan || 5–0 || 8–8 || 0–0
|- align="center" bgcolor="#ccffcc"
| 17 || April 2 || Bowling Green || Ray Fisher Stadium • Ann Arbor, Michigan || 11–0 || 9–8 || 0–0
|- align="center" bgcolor="#ccffcc"
| 18 || April 5 ||  || Ray Fisher Stadium • Ann Arbor, Michigan || 9–0 || 10–8 || 0–0
|- align="center" bgcolor="#ccffcc"
| 19 || April 5 || Wayne State || Ray Fisher Stadium • Ann Arbor, Michigan || 1–0 || 11–8 || 0–0
|- align="center" bgcolor="#ffcccc"
| 20 || April 8 || vs Western Michigan || Unknown • Unknown, Michigan || 7–9 || 11–9 || 0–0
|- align="center" bgcolor="#ccffcc"
| 21 || April 12 ||  || Ray Fisher Stadium • Ann Arbor, Michigan || 7–0 || 12–9 || 1–0
|- align="center" bgcolor="#ccffcc"
| 22 || April 13 || at Michigan State || Ray Fisher Stadium • East Lansing, Michigan || 7–0 || 13–9 || 2–0
|- align="center" bgcolor="#ffcccc"
| 23 || April 15 || vs  || Unknown • Unknown, Michigan || 2–11 || 13–10 || 2–0
|- align="center" bgcolor="#bbbbbb"
| 24 || April 15 || vs Central Michigan || Unknown • Unknown, Michigan || 5–5 || 13–10–1 || 2–0
|- align="center" bgcolor="#ffcccc"
| 25 || April 19 || vs  || Siebert Field • Minneapolis, Minnesota || 2–13 || 13–11–1 || 2–1
|- align="center" bgcolor="#ccffcc"
| 26 || April 19 || at Minnesota || Siebert Field • Minneapolis, Minnesota || 7–2 || 14–11–1 || 3–1
|- align="center" bgcolor="#ccffcc"
| 27 || April 20 || at  || Guy Lowman Field • Madison, Wisconsin || 5–2 || 15–11–1 || 4–1
|- align="center" bgcolor="#ccffcc"
| 28 || April 20 || at Wisconsin || Guy Lowman Field • Madison, Wisconsin || 4–1 || 16–11–1 || 5–1
|- align="center" bgcolor="#ccffcc"
| 29 || April 22 || Wayne State || Unknown • Unknown, Michigan || 4–3 || 17–11–1 || 5–1
|- align="center" bgcolor="#ccffcc"
| 30 || April 22 || Wayne State || Unknown • Unknown, Michigan || 11–3 || 18–11–1 || 5–1
|- align="center" bgcolor="#ffcccc"
| 31 || April 23 || Western Michigan || Unknown • Unknown, Michigan || 1–3 || 18–12–1 || 5–1
|- align="center" bgcolor="#ccffcc"
| 32 || April 23 || Western Michigan || Unknown • Unknown, Michigan || 9–4 || 19–12–1 || 5–1
|- align="center" bgcolor="#ccffcc"
| 33 || April 27 ||  || Unknown • Unknown, Michigan || 8–4 || 20–12–1 || 5–1
|- align="center" bgcolor="#ccffcc"
| 34 || April 27 || Eastern Michigan || Unknown • Unknown, Michigan || 4–2 || 21–12–1 || 5–1
|-

|- align="center" bgcolor="#ccffcc"
| 35 || May 3 || Purdue || Ray Fisher Stadium • Ann Arbor, Michigan || 5–2 || 22–12–1 || 6–1
|- align="center" bgcolor="#ccffcc"
| 36 || May 3 || Purdue || Ray Fisher Stadium • Ann Arbor, Michigan || 4–3 || 23–12–1 || 7–1
|- align="center" bgcolor="#ccffcc"
| 37 || May 4 ||  || Ray Fisher Stadium • Ann Arbor, Michigan || 7–2 || 24–12–1 || 8–1
|- align="center" bgcolor="#ccffcc"
| 38 || May 4 || Illinois || Ray Fisher Stadium • Ann Arbor, Michigan || 8–7 || 25–12–1 || 9–1
|- align="center" bgcolor="#ccffcc"
| 39 || May 7 || vs Eastern Michigan || Unknown • Unknown, Michigan || 4–3 || 26–12–1 || 9–1
|- align="center" bgcolor="#ffcccc"
| 40 || May 7 || vs Eastern Michigan || Unknown • Unknown, Michigan || 6–10 || 26–13–1 || 9–1
|- align="center" bgcolor="#ccffcc"
| 41 || May 10 ||  || Ray Fisher Stadium • Ann Arbor, Michigan || 4–0 || 27–13–1 || 10–1
|- align="center" bgcolor="#ccffcc"
| 42 || May 10 || Ohio State || Ray Fisher Stadium • Ann Arbor, Michigan || 7–1 || 28–13–1 || 11–1
|- align="center" bgcolor="#ccffcc"
| 43 || May 11 ||  || Ray Fisher Stadium • Ann Arbor, Michigan || 1–0 || 29–13–1 || 12–1
|- align="center" bgcolor="#ccffcc"
| 44 || May 11 || Indiana || Ray Fisher Stadium • Ann Arbor, Michigan || 18–4 || 30–13–1 || 13–1
|- align="center" bgcolor="#ffcccc"
| 45 || May 13 || vs  || Unknown • Unknown || 4–7 || 30–14–1 || 13–1
|- align="center" bgcolor="#ccffcc"
| 46 || May 14 || vs  || Unknown • Unknown, Michigan || 9–8 || 31–14–1 || 13–1
|- align="center" bgcolor="#ffcccc"
| 47 || May 14 || vs Detroit || Unknown • Unknown, Michigan || 8–9 || 31–15–1 || 13–1
|- align="center" bgcolor="#ccffcc"
| 48 || May 18 || vs  || Unknown • Unknown || 5–0 || 32–15–1 || 14–1
|- align="center" bgcolor="#ffcccc"
| 49 || May 18 || vs Northwestern || Unknown • Unknown || 2–3 || 32–16–1 || 14–2
|-

|-
|-
! style="" | Postseason
|- valign="top"

|- align="center" bgcolor="#ccffcc"
| 50 || May 22 || Central Michigan || Ray Fisher Stadium • Ann Arbor, Michigan || 9–4 || 33–16–1 || 14–2
|- align="center" bgcolor="#ccffcc"
| 51 || May 23 ||  || Ray Fisher Stadium • Ann Arbor, Michigan || 7–0 || 34–16–1 || 14–2
|- align="center" bgcolor="#ccffcc"
| 52 || May 23 || Nebraska || Ray Fisher Stadium • Ann Arbor, Michigan || 12–3 || 35–16–1 || 14–2
|-

|- align="center" bgcolor="#ccffcc"
| 53 || June 1 || vs  || Johnny Rosenblatt Stadium • Omaha, Nebraska || 9–8 || 36–16–1 || 14–2
|- align="center" bgcolor="#ffcccc"
| 54 || June 2 || vs Miami (FL) || Johnny Rosenblatt Stadium • Omaha, Nebraska || 2–3 || 36–17–1 || 14–2
|- align="center" bgcolor="#ffcccc"
| 55 || June 2 || vs Arizona || Johnny Rosenblatt Stadium • Omaha, Nebraska || 0–8 || 36–18–1 || 14–2
|-

Awards and honors 
Scott Dawson
 First Team All-Big Ten

George Foussianes
 First Team All-Big Ten
 Third Team All-American (ABCA)

Jim Paciorek
 First Team All-Big Ten
 College World Series Most Outstanding Player

References 

Michigan Wolverines baseball seasons
Michigan Wolverines baseball
College World Series seasons
Big Ten Conference baseball champion seasons
Michigan